Hickory High School may refer to:

 Hickory High School (North Carolina) — Hickory, North Carolina
 Hickory High School (Pennsylvania) — Hermitage, Pennsylvania
 Hickory High School (Virginia) — Chesapeake, Virginia
 the fictitious Indiana high school featured in the 1986 movie Hoosiers